The  were a Japanese team in Nippon Professional Baseball. A Pacific League expansion team in 1954, they were brought into the league to increase the number of teams to eight. The team was stocked with players from the other Pacific League teams, including aging pitcher Victor Starffin. In their three years of existence the team finished in the second division every season.

The Unions played their games at Kawasaki Stadium in Kawasaki, Kanagawa.

Franchise history 

The Pacific League had seven teams since the Japan Baseball League split into the Central and the Pacific League, but having an odd number of teams was inconvenient for scheduling and playoffs. Therefore, in 1953 it was decided that any team which finished below a winning percentage of .350 would be disbanded.  However, all the teams finished above the mark (Kintetsu had the worst record at .410) — therefore the league decided to admit an eighth team, the Unions.

The Unions were owned by Ryutaro Takahashi, the former president of Dai-Nippon Beer and owner of the Eagles Baseball Club/Kurowashi Black Eagles from 1939 to 1941. Takahashi had originally wanted to name the Unions the "Takahashi Eagles" after himself and a beer that had been produced by Dai-Nippon. However, the teams's name ended up being chosen by a public vote.

The team became the Tombo Unions after Tombow Pencil bought a share of the team in 1955, but reverted to its original name after Tombow withdrew before the following year.

Starffin pitched for the team in 1954–1955, going a combined 15-34, but managing to earn his 300th career win with the team.

The Unions, now in financial trouble, only lasted one more year before they merged with the Daiei Stars on February 26, 1957, to form the Daiei Unions.

Nippon Professional Baseball season-by-season records

External links

 
Baseball teams established in 1954
Baseball teams disestablished in 1956
Defunct Nippon Professional Baseball teams
1954 establishments in Japan
1956 disestablishments in Japan